Atiqullah Baryalai (born 1965) served as Deputy Defense Minister of Afghanistan from 2002 to 2004. He was also Commander of the North-Eastern Front against the Taliban and Al-Qaeda and headed the Disarmament Demobilization and Re-integration Commission (DDR), the Revival and Rebuilding of National Army Commission and the Reform Committee of the Ministry of Defense.

He is a Tajik from Panjshir Province. He was educated at Naderia High School, the National Military Academy of Afghanistan (BA, 1994), the Royal College of Defence Studies and the University of East Anglia (MA International Relations and Development Studies, 2012).

References

1965 births
Living people
Graduates of the Royal College of Defence Studies
Alumni of the University of East Anglia
Afghan military personnel
Afghan Tajik people
Afghan military officers